Oh the Glory of it All (2005), is a work of non-fiction by Sean Wilsey, published by Penguin Press.  A humorous coming-of-age memoir, the book chronicles Wilsey's troubled years growing up in a wealthy and prominent San Francisco family.

External links
Official Penguin Press page for the book 
New York Times book review (may require a subscription to access)

2005 non-fiction books
Books about the San Francisco Bay Area
Penguin Press books